is a tuning company headquartered in Nishitōkyō, Tokyo, Japan. It formerly specialized in turbo compression using Kühnle, Kopp & Kausch turbos on their first achievements, Blitz is now a general tuner offering parts ranging from simple pressure gauge to supercharging kit, including body kits.

Tuning
Blitz is not a brand specific tuner. Although it often presents the spearheading Nissan Skyline, Blitz also works on models from companies such as Subaru, Mitsubishi, Honda and Toyota. Also, it has a subsidiary specializing in European cars called Blitz AG.

Motorsports
Blitz also stands out in motorsport events such as in D1GP and drag racing. In D1GP, the company is represented by Ken Nomura and his Blitz D1 Spec ER34 Skyline. Blitz is also present in drag racing thanks to a Toyota Supra which cuts the quarter mile in about 9 seconds.

References

Automotive companies based in Tokyo
Manufacturing companies based in Tokyo
Automotive motorsports and performance companies
Auto parts suppliers of Japan
Japanese brands
Manufacturing companies established in 1980
Japanese companies established in 1980